The Square Rock Dipping Vat is a historic former cattle dipping facility in Ouachita National Forest, northeast of Waldron, Arkansas.  It is located south of Square Rock Creek, off a forest road that runs south from County Road 94.  It is a partially buried U-shaped concrete structure, with a concrete pad at one end, through which cattle were directed to dip them with chemical treatment for Texas tick fever.  A barbed-wire holding pen of uncertain age stands nearby.  It is believed to have been built about 1920, and was probably used until 1943, when the disease was determined to have been eradicated.

The vat was listed on the National Register of Historic Places in 2006.

See also
National Register of Historic Places listings in Scott County, Arkansas

References

Agricultural buildings and structures on the National Register of Historic Places in Arkansas
Buildings and structures completed in 1920
National Register of Historic Places in Scott County, Arkansas
1920 establishments in Arkansas
Plunge dips